Chimmini Wildlife sanctuary is a protected area located along the Western Ghats in Chalakudy taluk of Thrissur District of Kerala state in India.

Established in 1984, the sanctuary with an area of about 85.067 km2 is on the Western slopes of the Nelliyampathi Hills. The highest peak in sanctuary is Punda peak (1116 m). Along with the neighboring Peechi-Vazhani Wildlife Sanctuary it forms a continuous protected area of 210 km2. It also lies just west of Parambikulam Wildlife Sanctuary, providing some habitat connectivity with the forests of that relatively large protected area. The sanctuary consists of the watershed areas of Kurumali River and Mupliam rivers. Nestled in the sanctuary is Chimmony Dam which is built across the Chimmini river.

The headquarters of the sanctuary is at Echippara which is 40 km away from City of Thrissur. The sanctuary also offers trekking paths for the adventure traveller. Accommodation can be arranged at the Inspection Bungalow, near the Chimmini Dam. 

Visit Permits can be obtained from: The Wildlife Warden, Peechi Wildlife Division, Peechi 680653. It comes under the Peechi Wild Life Division.

References

External links
Chimmini dam Facebook Page

Wildlife sanctuaries in Kerala
Geography of Thrissur district
Protected areas of Kerala
Tourist attractions in Thrissur district
Protected areas established in 1984
1984 establishments in Kerala